Nishiyama(surname) ("western mountain") may refer to:

People with the surname
Hidetaka Nishiyama, American martial arts exponent and founder of Shotokan
Kazutaka Nishiyama, Japanese baseball player
Keiki Nishiyama, Japanese volleyball player
, Japanese photographer
, Japanese handball player
, Japanese baseball player
Norio Nishiyama, Japanese mixed martial artist
Rei Nishiyama, Japanese softball player
Reiji Nishiyama, director of the anime Pita-Ten
, Japanese footballer
Soin Nishiyama, Tokugawa-era poet
, Japanese footballer
Takahisa Nishiyama, Japanese soccer player
Takashi Nishiyama, Japanese video game developer
Teppei Nishiyama, Japanese football player
 Tomoka Nishiyama, Japanese shogi player
, Japanese architect, city planner and architectural scholar
, Japanese footballer
, Japanese long-distance runner

Fictional characters
Kankuro Nishiyama, a character in the manga/anime Muteki Kanban Musume

Places
Nishiyama, Niigata
Nishiyama Station (disambiguation), name of two different railway stations in Japan

Other uses
Nishiyama Craters, volcanic craters in Shikotsu-Tōya National Park, Hokkaido
6745 Nishiyama, an asteroid

See also
 西山 (disambiguation)
 Xishan (disambiguation)

Japanese-language surnames